The IGREJA UNIDA is a pentecostal evangelical church, founded in São Paulo, Brazil, on July 12, 1963 by its president – Pastor Luiz Schiliró. Its faith mission is totally based on Sacred Holy Writs – The Bible.

Its members accept and practice the baptism in waters for immersion, in the name of The Divine Trinity.

The Igreja Unida was born by the merging of the following churches: Igreja Cristã Pentecostal Evangelização e Cura Divina “Maravilhas de Jesus”; Igreja Evangélica do Povo end Igreja Cristã Evangélica Unida, in the opposite way of current trend of evangelical churches segmentation in Brazil.

By the time of its foundation, it was named Igreja Evangélica Pentecostal Unida, changed later due to legal requirements.
Igreja Unida is governed by its Convention, named Convenção Unida Brasileira, headquartered in São Paulo, legally constituted and defined by statutory laws, with Board of Directors,  Counsels and Departments.

Pastor Leonardo Meyer is the current president.

The IGREJA UNIDA keeps his Wikipedia page in Portuguese language.

References

External links
 Igreja Unida

Pentecostal churches